"Fire Waltz" is a composition by Mal Waldron. The original version, by Waldron's sextet featuring Eric Dolphy and Booker Ervin, was recorded on June 27, 1961. It has become a jazz standard.

Composition
Mal Waldron reported that he wrote the song the night before recording it. "Fire Waltz" is a 16-bar composition with the form AABA.

Original recording
The composition was first recorded on June 27, 1961. The sextet contained Booker Ervin (tenor saxophone), Eric Dolphy (alto saxophone), Waldron (piano), Ron Carter (cello), Joe Benjamin (bass), and Charlie Persip (drums). It was released on Waldron's album The Quest.

References

1960s jazz standards
1961 songs
Compositions by Mal Waldron
Jazz standards